The White House Task Force to Address Online Harassment and Abuse is a United States task force whose stated function is to address and prevent online harassment and abuse. It will particularly focus on online harassment and abuse against LGBT people and women, who are disproportionately affected. The task force was launched on June 16, 2022 in an announcement made by Vice President Kamala Harris.

Reception 
Conservatives and libertarians have criticized the task force, including former New York congresswoman Nan Hayworth, Media Research Center founder and CEO Brent Bozell, Conservative commentator Matt Whitlock, and the libertarian organization Young Americans for Liberty. Some of them have accused the task force of being similar to the recently paused Disinformation Governance Board (DGB). Conservatives have also accused the task force of being designed to censor conservative speech.

Mike Masnick of Techdirt also compared the task force to the DGB, calling the task force "Extremely One-Sided" and claiming that "one of the 'experts' at last week's panel once openly harassed a supporter of Section 230 for merely reporting, neutrally, on a Supreme Court decision, suggesting that people should set up fake profiles on sites and send people to rape the supporter." Masnick also raised concerns that the task force could violate the First Amendment, that several participants in the task force have expressed support for the removal of Section 230, and that a future president could use the task force for more nefarious purposes.

References 

2022 establishments in the United States
2022 in LGBT history
2022 in women's history
Biden administration controversies
Harassment
Government agencies established in 2022
Freedom of speech in the United States
Cyberbullying